This is a list of individuals who served in the House of Representatives of Nigeria in the 6th National Assembly.

References 

House of Representatives